Rain or Shine is the fifteenth solo studio album by the English singer-songwriter Paul Carrack. It was originally released in 2013 on Carrack's own Carrack-UK label, and was co-produced by Carrack and long-time associate Peter Van Hooke, who is Carrack's former Mike + The Mechanics bandmate.

Reception

AllMusic's Stephen Thomas Erlewine writes that "Rain or Shine captures Paul Carrack living comfortably inside his signature sound: a blue-eyed soul that turns happier with each passing year."

Track listing

Personnel 
Credits are adapted from the album's liner notes.
 Paul Carrack – vocals, acoustic piano, Hammond organ, guitars, bass, drums, vibraphone
 Jim Watson – acoustic piano (7, 10)
 Jeremy Meek – bass (5, 6)
 Steve Pearce – double bass (7, 8, 10)
 Jack Carrack – drums (1, 2, 5, 6, 9)
 Ian Thomas – drums (7, 8, 10)
 Doug Webb – alto saxophone
 Tom Luer – baritone saxophone
 Tom Evans – tenor saxophone 
 Steve Stassi – trumpet
 Lee Thornburg – trumpet
 Stringzilla Orchestra – strings (1-6, 8, 9, 10)
 Richard Niles – horn and string arrangements

Production
 Paul Carrack – producer
 Peter Van Hooke – producer
 Rupert Cobb – engineer, mixing
 Ashburn Miller – engineer (horns and strings) 
 Zavosh Rad – engineer (horns and strings)
 Andrea Hunnisett – photography
 Martin Huch – inlay photography
 Ian Ross – design

References

External links

2013 albums
Paul Carrack albums